Heeney is an unincorporated community and a census-designated place (CDP) located in and governed by Summit County, Colorado, United States. The CDP is a part of the Breckenridge, CO Micropolitan Statistical Area. The population of the Heeney CDP was 76 at the United States Census 2010. The Silverthorne post office  serves Heeney postal addresses.

History
The Heeney post office was established in 1939, and remained in operation until 1960. The community has the name of Paul Heeney, a local property owner.

Geography

Climate
This climate type is dominated by the winter season, a long, bitterly cold period with short, clear days, relatively little precipitation mostly in the form of snow, and low humidity.  According to the Köppen Climate Classification system, Heeney has a subarctic climate, abbreviated "Dfc" on climate maps.

Demographics

See also

Outline of Colorado
Index of Colorado-related articles
State of Colorado
Colorado cities and towns
Colorado census designated places
Colorado counties
Colorado metropolitan areas
Silverthorne, CO Micropolitan Statistical Area
Green Mountain Reservoir
White River National Forest

References

External links

Henney @ Colorado.com
Henney @ UncoverColorado.com
Green Mountain/Heeney Recreation in White River National Forest

Census-designated places in Summit County, Colorado
Census-designated places in Colorado